Dash Point State Park is a  Washington state park on Puget Sound that straddles the line between King and Pierce counties.

History 

Prior to being known as Dash Point the area was known as lson Landing, Fairview Beach, and Woodstock Beach. The origin of the name Dash Point is unclear. The area was named Dash Point on official maps by 1877.

The land was sold by the McLeod family to the State of Washington in the late 1940s for use as a park. The park was dedicated and developed in 1962 for the Seattle World's Fair.

Recreational Activities 
Dash Point State Park is a popular destination for residents of Federal Way during the summer months. Due to the tide patterns on the point, low tides reveal large areas of beach providing ample space for people to enjoy. It is common to see skim boarders on the beach. There is a yearly competition held by Dash Boards each summer.

The trails in the park are popular with runners. Entrances to the trail network can be found along many parts of the park in Federal Way and North East Tacoma.

References

External links
Dash Point State Park Washington State Parks and Recreation Commission 
Dash Point State Park Map Washington State Parks and Recreation Commission 
2017 Dash Point State Park Trail Map 

State parks of Washington (state)
Parks in King County, Washington
Parks in Pierce County, Washington